The 192nd Massachusetts General Court was a meeting of the legislative branch of the state government of Massachusetts. It consisted of elected members of the Senate and House of Representatives. It first convened in Boston at the Massachusetts State House on January 6, 2021, during the governorship of Charlie Baker. The 192nd term ended in early 2023. Will Brownsberger, Michael Moran, and Dan Hunt oversaw decennial redistricting based on the 2020 census.

Also in 2021, legislators debated whether or not to increase public access to information about their own proceedings. Other notable discussion topics include progressive taxation, the gig economy, climate change, spending of federal aid, driver's licenses, animal welfare, and civil asset forfeiture.

Leadership

Senate

House

{| class=wikitable
! Position !! Representative !! Municipality !! Party 
|-
| Speaker of the House || |Ronald Mariano
|Quincy || rowspan="10"  | Democratic
|-
|Majority Leader
|
|
|-
|Speaker Pro Tempore
| Kate Hogan
|Stow
|-
|Assistant Majority Leader
|Michael J. Moran
|Brighton
|-
| rowspan="2" | Second Assistant Majority Leader
| |Joseph F. Wagner
|Chicopee
|-
|Sarah K. Peake
|Provincetown
|-
|First Division Chair
|James J. O'Day
|West Boylston
|-
|Second Division Chair
|Ruth B. Balser
|Newton
|-
|Third Division Chair
|Frank A. Moran
|Lawrence
|-
|House Ways and Means Chair
|Aaron Michlewitz
|Boston
|-
|Minority Leader||Bradley H. Jones, Jr.|| North Reading || rowspan="5"  |Republican
|-
|First Assistant Minority Leader||Kimberly N. Ferguson
|Holden
|-
|Second Assistant Minority Leader||Paul K. Frost
|Auburn
|-
|rowspan="2" |Third Assistant Minority Leader||Susan Williams Gifford
|Wareham
|-
|F. Jay Barrows
|Mansfield
|}

Members
Senators

*Originally elected in a special election

Representatives
The following is a complete list of Members of the House of Representatives in the 192nd General Court, by district:

Barnstable, Dukes and Nantucket6 Representatives (3 Democrats, 3 Republicans)Berkshire4 Representatives (4 Democrats)Bristol14 Representatives (11 Democrats, 3 Republicans)Essex18 Representatives (15 Democrats, 3 Republicans)Franklin2 Representatives (1 Democrat, 1 Unenrolled)Hampden12 Representatives (9 Democrats, 3 Republicans)Hampshire3 Representatives (3 Democrats)Middlesex37 Representatives (34 Democrats, 3 Republicans)Norfolk15 Representatives (14 Democrats, 1 Republican)Plymouth12 Representatives (7 Democrats, 5 Republicans)Suffolk19 Representatives (19 Democrats)Worcester18 Representatives (10 Democrats, 8 Republicans)'''

*Originally elected in a special election

Changes in membership

Senate

House of Representatives

See also
 2020 Massachusetts general election
 COVID-19 pandemic in Massachusetts
 117th United States Congress
 2022 Massachusetts gubernatorial election
 List of Massachusetts General Courts

Notes

References

Further reading
 
 
 . ("...portal through which Massachusetts residents would be able to simultaneously apply for MassHealth, the Supplemental Nutrition Assistance Program (SNAP), cash assistance benefits, veterans benefits, and subsidies for child care, housing and fuel assistance.")

External links
 
 

Political history of Massachusetts
Massachusetts legislative sessions
Massachusetts
2021 in Massachusetts
Massachusetts
2022 in Massachusetts